Jackson Pearce (born 1984) is an American author. She writes young adult fiction and also publishes as J. Nelle Patrick.

Personal life and education
Pearce was born in Raleigh, North Carolina and, lives in Decatur, Georgia. She started writing at the age of twelve. She attended Brookwood High School and went on to Georgia College & State University before transferring to and graduating from the University of Georgia where she received her degree in English, minoring in philosophy.

Bibliography
As You Wish (August 25, 2009)
Purity (April 24, 2012) 
Tsarina (2014; as J. Nelle Patrick) 
Almost A Love Song (2022)

Fairy Tale series
Sisters Red (June 7, 2010)
Sweetly (August 23, 2011)
Fathomless (September 4, 2012)
Cold Spell (November 2013)

Doublecross series
The Doublecross 
The Inside Job (July 2016)

Pip Bartlett series
Pip Bartlett's Guide to Magical Creatures 
Pip Bartlett's Guide to Unicorn Training 
Pip Bartlett's Guide to Sea Monsters

Ellie, Engineer series
Ellie, Engineer
Ellie, Engineer: The Next Level 
Ellie, Engineer: In the Spotlight

References

External links

Living people
1984 births
American young adult novelists
American women novelists
21st-century American novelists
21st-century American women writers
Women writers of young adult literature
21st-century pseudonymous writers
Pseudonymous women writers
University of Georgia alumni